Qalandar Kashteh is a village in Horgan Rural District, in the Central District of Neyriz County, Fars Province, Iran. At the 2006 census, its population was 36, in 8 families.

References 

Populated places in Neyriz County